The 2001 ELMS at Donington Park was the second race for the 2001 European Le Mans Series season as well as the third race of the American Le Mans Series season.  It took place at Donington Park, United Kingdom, on April 14, 2001.

Official results

Class winners in bold.

Statistics
 Pole Position – #1 Audi Sport Team Joest – 1:22.122
 Fastest Lap – #1 Audi Sport Team Joest
 Distance – 462.3 km
 Average Speed – 167.34 km/h

External links
 Official Results
 World Sports Racing Prototypes - Race Results

Donington
Donington
6 Hours of Donington
ELMS at Donington Park
April 2001 sports events in the United Kingdom